The Tartan 27 Yawl is an American trailerable sailboat that was designed by Sparkman & Stephens as a cruiser and first built in 1961.

The Tartan 27 Yawl is a development of the Tartan 27 sloop, with a shorter main mast and the addition of a mizzen mast with a sail of  mounted in the lazarette. The Tartan 27 series was developed into the Tartan 27-2 in 1976.

Darrell Nicholson of Practical Sailor, noted of the Tartan 27 Yawl, "a small number of 27s, for what we assume was quaintness rather than any practical reason, were rigged as yawls with handkerchief-sized mizzens on a mast stepped into the lazarette."

Production
Production was initially by Douglass & McLeod at their Grand River, Ohio factory, starting in 1961 and ending in 1971 when the plant burned down. Production was then assumed by a new company, Tartan Marine, established in nearby Painesville, Ohio, in 1971. Only about 25 Tartan 27 Yawls were built.

Design

The Tartan 27 Yawl is a recreational keelboat, built predominantly of fiberglass, with wood trim. It has a masthead yawl rig, a raked stem, an angled transom, a keel-mounted rudder controlled by a tiller and a fixed modified long keel with a cutaway forefoot and a retractable centerboard. It displaces  and carries  of ballast.

Operational history

Robert Manry, along with his wife Virginia, his son and daughter, a German shepherd dog and a cat, sailed his 1967 Tartan 27 Yawl, named Curlew from Cleveland, Ohio, across the Great Lakes, down the Mississippi River, through the Gulf of Mexico to the Bahamas, north along the US east coast and then back to his point of departure, Cleveland. The voyage was accomplished from July 1967 until July 1968.

See also
List of sailing boat types

Related development
Tartan 27
Tartan 27-2

References

External links

Keelboats
1960s sailboat type designs
Sailing yachts
Trailer sailers
Sailboat type designs by Sparkman and Stephens
Sailboat types built by Douglass & McLeod
Sailboat types built by Tartan Marine